Ki Tae-young (born Kim Yong-woo on December 9, 1978) is a South Korean actor. Ki made his acting debut in 1997, and went on to play leading roles in the television dramas Creating Destiny (2009), Living in Style (2011), and Make a Wish (2014). He also released an EP in 2012.

He married his Creating Destiny co-star Eugene on July 23, 2011. Their first child, a daughter named Ro-hee, was born in 03 April 2015. And another girl, Ro-rin on 18 August 2018. He is loved by viewers for starring on KBS 2 Superman Returns on January 24, 2016.

Filmography

Television series

Film

Variety show

Discography

Awards and nominations

References

External links
 
 
 

South Korean male television actors
South Korean male film actors
People from Seoul
1978 births
Living people
21st-century South Korean male singers